Paul Taunton Matthews CBE FRS (19 November 1919 – 26 February 1987) was a British theoretical physicist.

Biography
Matthews was born in Erode in British India, and was educated at Mill Hill School and Clare College, Cambridge, where he was awarded MA and PhD degrees. He was awarded the Adams Prize in 1958, elected to the Royal Society in 1963, and awarded the Rutherford Medal and Prize in 1978. He became head of the Physics Department of Imperial College, London and later vice chancellor of the University of Bath. He was also awarded an Honorary Degree (Doctor of Science) by the University of Bath in 1983. He was also chairman of the Nuclear Physics Board of the Science Research Council.

He died in Cambridge from injuries sustained in a cycling accident.

References

External links

1919 births
1987 deaths
Fellows of the Royal Society
Commanders of the Order of the British Empire
Particle physicists
Academics of Imperial College London
Vice-Chancellors of the University of Bath
Alumni of Clare College, Cambridge
Deans of the Royal College of Science